The International Journal on Artificial Intelligence Tools was founded in 1992 and is published by World Scientific. It covers research on artificial intelligence (AI) tools or tools that use AI, including architectures, languages and algorithms. Topics include AI in Bioinformatics, Cognitive Informatics, Knowledge-Based/Expert Systems and Object-Oriented Programming for AI.

Abstracting and indexing 
The journal is abstracted and indexed in:

 Inspec
 Science Citation Index Expanded
 ISI Alerting Services
 CompuMath Citation Index
 Current Contents/Engineering, Computing, and Technology

Computer science journals
Publications established in 1992
World Scientific academic journals
English-language journals